Dafna Kaffeman (born 1972, Jerusalem) is an artist and a senior lecturer at the Bezalel Academy of Arts and Design. She works with glass and various materials and techniques such as embroidery, print ,drawing, to produce what the David Owsley Museum of Art describes as "beautiful crafted surfaces and disturbing text about aggressors and victims". She lives and works in Israel. Her work has appeared in solo and group exhibitions, and she has won, or been nominated for, a number of international prizes and awards.

Biography
Dafna Kaffeman graduated in 1999 from the Gerrit Rietveld Academy in Amsterdam, and in 2001 received a Master of Fine Arts from the Sandberg Institute, also in Amsterdam. She had one-person shows, among others, at the San Francisco Museum of Craft and Design (2015–16); the David Owsley Museum of Art at Ball State University in Muncie, Indiana, (2014–15); Keramikmuseum Westerwald in Rhineland-Palatinate, Germany (2013); the American University Museum in Washington, D.C. (2011); and the lorch + seidel contemporary in Berlin, Germany (2006, 2010, 2013, 2017). She has participated in many group shows in Europe and the United States. In 2019 she won the Andree Matter Award for a woman artist by MADREEMA foundation. She won the Design Prize from the Israel culture ministry in 2016 and was awarded the Prize for the Advancement of the Arts (Israel) in 2011.

Kaffeman's works are exhibited in the collections of various museums such as the  Israel Museum in Jerusalem, IL, the Montreal Museum of Contemporary Art in Montreal, Canada, the Victoria and Albert Museum, in London, England,  the Corning Museum of Glass, in Corning, N.Y,Coburg Museum, Germany and more. She is senior lecturer, and was head of the glass course, at the Bezalel Academy of Arts and Design in Jerusalem between 2005 and 2011.

Kaffeman taught in various institutes such as the Tokyo Art University, Japan, Ball State University in Indiana, USA, Massachusetts Collage of Arts, Boston, USA, Kublenz University, Germany, Corning Museum of Glass, NY, USA. She had lectured at the Natural History Museum in TA, IL, The Gerrit Rietveld Academy, Amsterdam, NL, The Royal Collage of Arts, London, England.

Working methods
Described as "a poetess in glass," Kaffeman's work deals with social and political processes in Israel using several layers—texts that refer to events in the country and images of local flora and fauna—through which she addresses themes such as identity and immigration.

Using lamp working techniques, she has been building a botanical collection made of glass. Each work, whether of plants or insects, is informed by personal observation of the local environment through a cultural and an iconographic interpretation. In recent years, research processes, including drawing on paper, have become an integral part of her exhibitions. Embroidery plays a significant role in the work, serving as a platform for the text on which the work is based, and enabling collaboration with a varied range of populations.

The catalogue of the winners of the 2011 Israeli Minister of Culture prizes describes Kaffeman's work as: "Using a botanic lexicon that reaches into cultural practices of commemoration, sacrifice and mourning, the artist blends local values in meticulously crafted glass and embroidery work."

Davira Taraqin writes of her work:

Since 2002, Kaffeman's increasingly transparent statements, first on politics and now on social issues, have taken two distinct directions. The plant and animal forms that comprise such series as 'Tactual Stimulation' and 'Wolves' are fabricated primarily from flame-worked glass. Kaffeman maintains that her subjects provided her a means to explore human behavior; but even early on her references to nature—a recurring metaphor used by many young Israeli artists—demonstrate her deep kinship with her homeland...Since 2006, Kaffeman has also made mini-environments that consist of embroidered handkerchiefs or felt to which she affixes flame-worked glass plants, sometimes insects...These carefully considered micro-environments present the disparity between beautiful crafted surfaces and disturbing text about aggressors and victims. (From the catalogue Without Camouflage. Dafna Kaffeman. Silvia Levenson, published by the David Owsley Museum of Art, Indiana, April 2014)

Exhibitions

Solo exhibitions
Aerial Roots, Petach Tikva Museum of Art, Israel, Curator Irena Gordon, Aug – Dec 2021
if you thirst for a homeland, Chrysler Museum of Art, Norfok, Virginia, Curators Carolyn Swan Needell & Trudy Wiesenberger , Aug – Dec 2021, Roe Green Gallery at the Jewish Federation of Cleveland, April 2021
cotton plant, lorch+seidel contemporary, Berlin, Germany, September - November 2017 
Without Camouflage, Museum of Craft and Design San Francisco, CA, USA, Curator Davira Taragin, September 2015 – March 2016
David Owsley Museum of Art, IN, USA, Curator Davira Taragin, April–August 2014
Eretz Israel Museum, Ramat Aviv, Israel, Curator Henrietta Eliezer Brunner, 2013
Invasive Plants, lorch+seidel contemporary, Berlin, Germany, 2013
Invasive Plants, Keramikmuseum Westerwarld, Höhr-Grenzhausen, Germany, Curator Prof. Jens Gussek, 2013
What Could Be Better Than Going to Paradise?, American University Museum, Washington DC, USA, Curator Jack Rasmussen, 2011
Mantis Religiosa, lorch+seidel contemporary, Berlin, Germany, 2010
Red Everlasting, Utsira Lighthouse, Stavanger, European Capital of Culture, Norway, 2008
Persian Cyclamen, lorch+seidel contemporary, Berlin, Germany, 2006
I Was Trained Hunting Wolves, Heller Gallery, New York, USA, 2004
Special exhibit, Eretz Israel Museum, Ramat Aviv, Israel, Curator Henrietta Eliezer Brunner, 2002

Selected group exhibitions
Design Bienalle, Eretz Israel Museum, TA, IL , Curator Henrietta Eliezer Brunner & Yuval Saar, May 2019 - May 2021
New Glass Now, Corning Museum of Glass, NY, USA , Curator Susie J Silbert, May 12 2019 - January 2 2020
Seeds of the Land, Israel Museum Ticho House , Jerusalem , IL, Curator Tami Manor-Freidman, March 31- November 2 2019
Unwilfull Movment, Jerusalem Print Workshop, Jerusalem, IL, Curator Irena Gordon, May 28 - August 15 2019
Vitreous Bodies: Assembled Visions in Glass, Stephen D. Paine Galleries, Massachusetts College of Art and Design, Boston, USA, curator Lisa Tung, 23 January – 4 March 2017
Glass Now, Galerie HAndwerk, Munich, Germany, curator Dr. Angela Böck, 12 October – 19 November 2016
New Acquisitions 2016, Glasmuseum Alter Hof Herding, Ernsting Stiftung, Germany, curators Lilly Ernsting and Dr. Ulrike Hoppe-Oehl, 14 January – 17 May 2017
Departures and Arrivals, Two Artists Show, lorch + seidel contemporary, Berlin, 23 April – 4 June 2016
Why Glass?, lorch + seidel contemporary, Berlin, 5 Dec –5 March 2015
In the Name of Love, Alexander Tutsek-Stiftung, Germany, Curator Prof. Dr. Florian Hufnagl, 7 February 2012 – 30 April 2013
The Winners, Culture Ministry Prizes 2011, Petach Tikva Museum, Israel, Curator Naomi Aviv, 2012
Menschen, Tiere, Sensationen, lorch + seidel contemporary, Berlin, 10 December – 28 January 2012
The Anna and Joe Mendel Collection, The Montreal Museum of Fine Arts, Montreal, Canada, Curator Diane Charbonneau, 2010
Glas-Museum Alter Hof Herding, Ernsting Stiftung, Germany, curator Dr. Ulrike Hoppe-Oehl, 2010
Four in One, lorch + seidel contemporary, Berlin, 18 September – 20 November 2010
Glas, Gemeenteuseum, The Netherlands, Curators Caroline Prisse and titus M. Eliansse, 2009
Ashes to Ashes, Virginia Museum of Contemporary Art, VA, USA, 2009
Artists of the Gallery, lorch + seidel contemporary, Berlin, 12 December 2009 – 13 February 2010
Three Artists of the Gallery, lorch + seidel contemporary, 26 January – 5 April 2008
Pricked Extreme Embroidery, MAD Museum, New York, USA Curator David Macfadden, 2007
Fragile Reality, Eretz Israel Museum, Ramat Aviv, Israel, Curator Enrietta Eliezer Brunner, 2007
Artists of the Gallery, lorch + seidel contemporary, 5 December 2006 – 10 March 2007
Glas-Museum Alter Hof Herding, Ernsting Stiftung, Coesfeld-Lette, Germany, 2007
Racine Art Museum, Racine, WI, USA, 2005
Museum Jan van der Togt, Amsterlveen, NL, 2002

Works in collections
The Israel Museum. Jerusalem, Israel.
The Montreal Museum of Fine Arts. Montreal, Canada.
Corning Museum of Glass, Corning, NY, USA.
David Owsley Museum of Art, Muncie, IN, USA
Museum of American Glass, Millville, NJ, USA.
Racine Art Museum, Racine, WI, USA.
Glasmuseum Alter Hof Herding, Ernsting Stiftung, Coesfeld-Lette, Germany.
Victoria & Albert Museum, London, England.
Museum of Modern Glass, Kunstsammlungen der Veste Coburg, Coburg, Germany.
Alexander Tutsek-Stiftung, Germany.
Musée Centre d'Art du Verre, Carmaux, Tarn, France.

Prizes
2019: Andree Matter Award for a woman Artist, MADREEMA Foundation
2016: Prize for creation in the field of Design, Ministry of Culture, Israel.
2011: Prize for the Advancement of the Arts, Ministry of Culture, Israel.
2007: Finalist, Bombay Sapphire Prize, UK
2005–2006: Award by the Hilbert Sosin Fund of the Florida Glass Art Alliance.
2004: Honoree Diploma, Jutta-Cuny-Franz Memorial Award, Jutta-Cuny-Franz Foundation, Germany.
2002: Nomination, Bernadine de Neeveprijs, the Netherlands

References

External links
 Artist web site
 lorch + seidel contemporary
 Bezalel Academy for Art and Design

1972 births
Living people
21st-century Israeli women artists
Embroiderers